Amis ( or ) is a Formosan language of the Amis (or Ami), an indigenous people living along the east coast of Taiwan. Currently the largest of the Formosan languages, it is spoken from Hualien in the north to Taitung in the south, with another population in the Hengchun Peninisula near the southern end of the island, though the northern varieties are considered to be separate languages.

Government services in counties where many Amis people live in Taiwan, such as the Hualien and Taitung railway stations, broadcast in Amis alongside Mandarin. However, few Amis under the age of 20 in 1995 spoke the language. It is not known how many of the 200,000 ethnic Amis speak the language, but overall a third of the aboriginal Taiwanese population do.

Dialects
Amis is a dialect cluster. There are five dialects: Southern Amis, Tavalong-Vataan, Central Amis, Chengkung-Kwangshan, and Northern Amis (Nanshi Amis, which includes Nataoran).

Sakizaya is a moribund language spoken among the northernmost ethnic Amis but is mutually unintelligible with the Northern Amis dialect.

Phonology
The following discussion covers the central dialect of Amis.

Consonants

The glottal stop is an exception, frequently having no audible release in final position. The sibilants, are optionally palatalized before .  does not occur in word-initial position.  is often post-alveolar, and in final position it is released:  "fog".

 shows dramatic dialectal variation. In Northern Amis, it is a plosive , which may be laxed to  intervocalically. The epiglottals are also reported to have different pronunciations in the north, but the descriptions are contradictory. Edmondson and Elsing report that these are true epiglottals initially and medially, but in utterance-final position they are epiglotto–pharyngeal.

Sakizaya, considered to be a separate language, contrasts a voiced  with voiceless .

Vowels

Amis has three common vowels, .

A voiceless epenthetic schwa optionally breaks up consonant clusters, as noted above. However, there are a small number of words where a short schwa (written e) may be phonemic. However, no contrast involving the schwa is known, and if it is also epenthetic, then Amis has words with no phonemic vowels at all.

Examples of words 

Compare with Tagalog baboy (pig), aso (dog), tatlo (3), apat (4), lima (5), anim (6), pito (7), walo (8)
 Compare with Kapampangan asu (dog), atlo (3), apat (4), lima (5), anam (6), pitu/pito (7), walu/walo (8), siyam (9), apulu/apulo (10) and ama (father) and ima (mother)
 Compare with Ilokano baboy(pig), aso (dog), maysa (1), dua (2), tallo (3), uppat (4), lima (5), inem (6), pito (7), walo (8), siam (9), sangapulo  (10)
 Compare with Javanese lutung (monkey), babi (pig), asu (dog), siji (1), loro (2), telu (3), papat (4), lima (5), enem (6), pitu (7), wolu (8), sanga (9), sepuluh (10)
 Compare with Sundanese lutung (monkey), babi (pig), hiji (1), dua (2), tilu (3), opat (4), lima (5), genep (6), tujuh (7), dalapan (8), salapan (9), sapuluh (10)
 Compare with Malay lotong/lutung (monkey), babi (pig), satu (1), dua (2), tiga (3), empat (4), lima (5), enam (6), sembilan (9), sepuluh (10)
maolah kako mimali = I like to play sports.
takaraw ko pita’kod = I jump very high.
kalamkam ko kacomikay = I run very fast.
Ira ko tata’angay a mata ako = I have big eyes
mamangay a ngoyos = A small mouth
takaya’ay a fokes = long hair
sowal san ko kahacecay a tamdaw makapahay kako = Everyone tells me that I am beautiful.
mafana’ay miasik, misawsaw to kaysing, milidong to fodoy = I can sweep the floor, wash dishes and clothing.
maolah midemak kako to tayal no loma’ = I love to do household chores.
nawhani maolah kako to loma’ no mako = Because I love my home.

Grammar
Verbs in the Amis language have some inflections including existential clause, active voice, passive voice, disposal sentence, imperative mood, optative mood, and prohibitive mood.

Case markers
Cases are marked by case particles.

Syntax
There are two word orders in Amis called "General" Word Order and "Special" Word Order.

Below are some examples of Amis sentence:

"General" Word Order Sentence I : Verb–subject

Example
Maomahay ci wama. (The father is working in the field.)
mimaomahay: working (in the field)
ci: subject preposition for personal proper noun
wama: father
Misaholoay ci wina. (The mother is cooking rice.)
misaholoay: cooking (rice)
ina/wina: mother

"General" Word Order Sentence II : Verb–subject–object

Example
Mifaca' ko kaying to riko'. (The young woman is washing clothes.)
Mifaca' koya kaying to riko'. (That young woman is washing clothes.)
mifaca': wash (clothes)
ko: subject preposition for common nouns
kaying: young woman
to: object preposition for common nouns
riko'/fudoy: clothes

Toponyms
Sing ’Olam (2011:300–301) lists the following Amis names for villages and towns in Hualien County and Taitung County of eastern Taiwan.

References

Citations

Sources

External links
 Central Amis Wordlist at the Austronesian Basic Vocabulary Database
 Kaipuleohone's Robert Blust's collection includes materials on Central Amis.
 Yuánzhùmínzú yǔyán xiànshàng cídiǎn 原住民族語言線上詞典  – Amis search page at the "Aboriginal language online dictionary" website of the Indigenous Languages Research and Development Foundation
 Amis teaching and learning materials published by the Council of Indigenous Peoples 
 Amis translation of President Tsai Ing-wen's 2016 apology to indigenous people – published on the website of the presidential office
 

Amis people
Formosan languages
Languages of Taiwan